Sclerolaena anisacanthoides, the yellow burr, is a species of flowering plant in the family Amaranthaceae, native to eastern Australia. A perennial rounded subshrub reaching , it is typically found growing in heavy soils.

References

anisacanthoides
Endemic flora of Australia
Flora of Queensland
Flora of New South Wales
Taxa named by Ferdinand von Mueller
Plants described in 1921